Ceratozamia matudae is a species of plant in the family Zamiaceae. It is native to Mexico, where it occurs in the states of Chiapas and Oaxaca, and its distribution extends into western Guatemala. Though some populations are in protected areas, the species is still affected by habitat loss as forest is cleared for plantations.

References

matudae
Flora of Chiapas
Flora of Oaxaca
Flora of Guatemala
Endangered plants
Endangered biota of Mexico
Taxonomy articles created by Polbot